The Black Local Authorities Act of 1982 provided for the establishment of a series of local government structures similar to those operating in the South African Apartheid "White areas". For the first time under Apartheid, African black residents of urban locations gained something like autonomy. Although the African black race did not have access to Parliament, this Act gave the racial group some local township power.

Elected by local residents, councillors were responsible for township administration on budgets raised by local rents and levies.

Repeal
The Act was repealed on 2 February 1994 by the Local Government Transition Act, 1993.

See also
 :Category:Apartheid laws in South Africa
 Apartheid in South Africa

References

External links
 African History: Apartheid Legislation in South Africa

Apartheid laws in South Africa
1982 in South African law